Louhans-Cuiseaux Football Club is a football club located in Louhans, France.

History
The club was founded in 1970 as Club Sportif Louhans Cuiseaux 71 after the merger of Club Sportif Louhannais (founded in 1916) and Club de Cuiseaux (founded in 1930), based in the villages of Louhans and Cuiseaux. It took the current name after a further merger with FC Louhans in 2013.  The club currently competes in the Championnat National 2, the fourth level of the French football league system, following promotion in 2019, and plays at the Stade du Bram.

On 13 June 2006, Togo midfielder Alaixys Romao made history when he became the first Louhans-Cuiseaux player ever to appear at the World Cup finals, in Togo's first-round game against South Korea in Frankfurt.

Former managers
 Philippe Hinschberger
 Christian Lariepe
 Alain Michel

References

 
Association football clubs established in 1970
Sport in Saône-et-Loire
1970 establishments in France
Football clubs in Bourgogne-Franche-Comté